This is a list of characters from the TV series, Krypto the Superdog.

Protagonists

Krypto the Superdog
Krypto the Superdog (voiced by Samuel Vincent) is the main protagonist of the show, formerly Superman's pet on Krypton before it was destroyed. Krypto came to Earth in a rocket when it malfunctioned. He is a white Labrador Retriever and has all of the powers of Superman, though some are heightened due to being a dog, such as his super hearing and sense of smell. Krypto also shares Superman's moral values and feelings.

Streaky the Supercat
Streaky the Supercat (voiced by Brian Drummond), Krypto's best friend and sidekick, is an orange Somali cat with a yellow streak along his back who lives next door to Krypto and Kevin's family. In episode 3, "The Streaky Story", Streaky gained superpowers by a duplicating ray that was aimed at Krypto, but deflected off his super coat and accidentally hit Streaky instead. Streaky later found that he had superpowers similar to Krypto's, but his superpowers are weaker than Krypto's, presumably due to them being the result of copying. Streaky shares his canine counterpart's weakness to Kryptonite. Streaky belongs to a girl named Andrea. Unlike Krypto, Streaky is less serious about his superhero activities, and sometimes needs prodding to perform heroic deeds, but usually is dependable. He also has a nephew named Squeaky who is the leader of the Supercat Fan Club. Streaky often refers to Krypto as "K-Dog".

Ace the Bat-Hound
Ace the Bat-Hound (voiced by Scott McNeil) is Batman's pet Great Dane (though Ace says that he is Batman's partner) who is the mentor of Krypto, Streaky and the Dog Star Patrol. Ace fights crime utilizing various detective skills and gadgetry built into his collar (an analogue of Batman's utility belt); he also uses a rocket sled for traveling long distances. Ace wears a dark-colored cape and collar similar to Batman's, and (like Batman) possesses a stoic personality. However, Ace does occasionally work alongside Krypto and considers him an ally. Ace's nemeses are Catwoman's pet cat, Isis, the Joker's two pet hyenas Bud and Lou, and the Penguin's three trained pet birds Artie, Griff, and Waddles.

The Dog Star Patrol
The Dog Star Patrol are a superpowered group of canines who each possess a unique superpower, and fight crime across the galaxy. Krypto joined the Dog Star Patrol by helping the group out on a mission. Ace the Bat-Hound and Streaky the Supercat also helped them out on different occasions. The group is based on DC Comics' Space Canine Patrol Agents and Legion of Super-Heroes. Curiously, they are never seen altogether as one or two members are always absent in most episodes featuring the Dog Star Patrol, apart from "Circus of the Dog Stars" and "Bat Hound Meets the Dog Stars". The characters were later carried over to other DC Comics media such as the DC Super-Pets chapter book series.

The members of the Dog Star Patrol include:

 Brainy Barker (voiced by Ellen Kennedy) - A purple Saluki and leader of the Dog Star Patrol. Brainy Barker possesses telepathic/telekinetic powers, allowing her to read minds, project force fields, and levitate objects.
 Mammoth Mutt (voiced by Kelly Sheridan) - A pink Chihuahua with the ability to inflate her body to an enormous ball-shaped size, allowing her to use her size to attack foes. She can also expand other parts of her body.
 Bull Dog (voiced by Michael Dobson) - A lavender Bulldog with a stereotypical British accent and two big, bull-like horns that can be used for attacking foes and breaking objects.
 Paw Pooch (voiced by Dale Wilson) - A yellow and brown Basset Hound with eight legs that enable him to dig and run quickly. They can also grow in size, as seen in "Puss In Space Boots".
 Tail Terrier (voiced by Peter Kelamis) - A green Scottish Terrier with the ability to stretch his tail and use it like a lasso. He also has a stereotypical Texas accent.
 Tusky Husky (voiced by Terry Klassen) - A sky blue Alaskan Malamute with a stereotypical French-Canadian accent and a giant front tooth which is incredibly durable and can be used as a drill.
 Hot Dog (voiced by Trevor Devall) - A red Dachshund with the ability to generate tremendous heat from his body and breathe fire. He also has a short temper, but started to control his anger in "Bones Of Contention".
 Drooly (voiced by Ty Olsson): An Old English Sheepdog who can use his drool as a weapon in various ways, such as grabbing objects, creating bubbles, and using it as projectiles. Appeared only in "The New Recruit" and was made a reserve member after defeating Mechanikat's forces.

Kevin Whitney
Kevin Whitney (voiced by Alberto Ghisi) is the 9-year-old young boy who Krypto lives with in the series, with Superman's permission. Kevin enjoys Krypto's company greatly, and is able to communicate with him and the other animals in the series thanks to a universal translator device. Kevin has a bratty cousin named Bailey who finds out Krypto's secret, but fortunately, he is such a notorious liar that no adult believes him. Kevin also has a 2-year-old sister named Melanie who refers to Krypto as "Kippo".

Andrea Sussman
Andrea Sussman (voiced by Tabitha St. Germain) is Kevin's next-door neighbor and the owner of Streaky. Andrea enjoys making Streaky play dress-up, but was unaware of his (or Krypto's) superheroic identity until later in the series, when she accidentally stumbles upon Krypto's spaceship. In "Iguanikkah", it is revealed that Andrea is Jewish. She loves to play and dress up Streaky, and she treats him like a baby.

Supporting characters
 Superman (voiced by Michael Daingerfield) - The main superhero of Metropolis and Krypto's original owner. He was only seen in "Krypto's Scrypto" Pt. 2. He allows Kevin to watch over Krypto since he gets called away on missions.
 Stretch-O-Mutt (voiced by Lee Tockar): Buddy, a Bloodhound at S.T.A.R. Labs, accidentally fell into a vat of chemicals and developed shape-changing powers similar to Plastic Man and Elongated Man. Sometimes he can be too silly for his own good.
 Thundermutt (voiced by Phil Hayes) - An egotistical, world-famous canine actor who plays a heroic canine in the movies. He is a silver German Shepherd Dog who was somewhat jealous of Krypto when he "stole" the limelight at one of his movie premieres (Thundermutt II: Scratch And Sniff). Though he is cowardly, he is also mostly good at heart. The films he has appeared in, that are mentioned in the show, are Thundermutt II: Scratch And Sniff, Invasion of the Alien Cats, K-9 Krusader and Harry Rottweiler and the Doghouse of Doom (a parody of Indiana Jones and the Temple of Doom).
 Jimmy the Rat (voiced by Phil Hayes) - A rat who often serves as an informant for Krypto and Ace.
 Robbie the Bird Wonder (voiced by David Paul Grove) - An American robin whose life was saved after he witnessed an encounter between Ace and the Joker's hyenas. After that, he decides to be Ace's sidekick, much to Ace's dismay. Robbie was based on Robin. Like Ace, he has gadgets like a glider, birdarangs, and egg bombs and he also came back to Gotham to be partners with Ace.
 The Supercat Fan Club - Led by Streaky's nephew, Squeaky, they are a group of fans of Streaky. They occasionally help Streaky stop crime around Metropolis even though they do not have powers.
 Melanie Whitney (voiced by Tabitha St. Germain) - Kevin's 2-year-old baby sister. She knows that Krypto ("Kippo" as she puts it) is Superdog, but being a baby, her parents do not take her seriously.
 Smokey (voiced by Phil Hayes) - A Dalmatian who appears in "Old Dog, New Tricks". He believes that the firemen are going to replace him with a new puppy. So Streaky paints spots on Krypto to prove that Smokey is still up to the job, though at the end of the episode, he is still in the Fire Service working with Blaze.
 Blaze - The Dalmatian puppy in "Old Dog, New Tricks". Streaky thought Blaze was intended to be Smokey's replacement, but Smokey explained that Blaze is his new trainee. The firemen believe that Smokey can teach Blaze the ropes until the time he helps in fire emergencies.

Other characters
 Dooley (voiced by Brad Swaile) - A dolphin who befriends Krypto and Streaky when they were turned into fish in "Furry Fish".
 Squeaky (voiced by Lee Tockar) - Streaky's nephew who is the leader of the Supercat Fan Club.
Dogbot (voiced by Scott McNeil) - A robot dog built by Jor-El to keep Krypto company while he was in space, he appears in the episode of the same name and Dogbot to the rescue.
Nikki, Puff and Ramone (voiced by Kathleen Barr, Samuel Vincent, and Brian Drummond respectively) - A group of young kittens and Squeaky's friends who are members of The Supercat Fan Club (with Squeaky as their leader), dedicated to Streaky.

Antagonists

Mechanikat
Mechanikat (voiced by Mark Oliver) is the main antagonist of the series, he is based on Metallo. Mechanikat is a cyborg feline, who constantly plots to conquer Earth. He usually keeps a bit of green Kryptonite on hand to use against Krypto, or to power up his machines with so they can affect Krypto.

In "Mechanikalamity," Mechanikat is revealed to be a member of the Intergalactic Villains Club (a spoof of the Legion of Doom) who gather in a base similar to the Hall of Doom. Due to Mechanicat's repeated failure to defeat Krypto, he has been unable to get elected as leader with the recent election having the members voting for Glorg to be the leader of the Intergalactic Villains Club.

Despite being the main antagonist, he rarely takes matters into his own paws and fight Krypto on his own, normally using machines or other villains to face him.

Snooky Wookums
Snooky Wookums (voiced by Nicole Bouma) is Mechanikat's sidekick and secret agent. Snooky is a blue kitten mastermind who uses his cuteness and intelligence to cause all sorts of trouble for Krypto and the Dog Star Patrol. He later became part of the Supercat Fan Club.

Delilah
Delilah (voiced by Kathleen Barr) is another feline agent of Mechanikat. Delilah's outfit changes in season two, adding on purple-colored plates of armor in various areas on her body. She is also in charge of weapons and helped make the Katbots. She also knows nine different types of kung fu.

Katbots
The Katbots are the foot soldiers of Mechanikat.

Ignatius
Ignatius (voiced by Scott McNeil) is the sarcastic pet green iguana of Superman's archenemy, Lex Luthor. Like Luthor, Ignatius is very intelligent, vain and is morally ambivalent about making others suffer for personal gain; however, he is effete, selfish and tends to behave in a much less dignified manner than Luthor. He is also more prone to engaging in frivolous (and dangerous) personal whims, such as employing a growth ray to enlarge a bug for his supper or using a wind tunnel to harvest one of Krypto's hairs as part of a scheme to grow himself a lovely fur coat. Notable is that on occasion, he shows basic morals and honor.

Other antagonists
 Lex Luthor (voiced by Brian Dobson) - An evil genius and the owner of Ignatius, who is very intelligent and uses technology to take over the city. He is Superman's archnemesis that is always causing chaos and is the CEO of LexCorp where he makes his own top secret gadgets.
 Bud and Lou (voiced by Peter Kelamis and Lee Tockar respectively) - A pair of spotted hyenas who serve the Joker. Some confusion about which is Bud and which is Lou can be found, considering that both of them look almost exactly the same other than their collars. Bud wears a purple collar and Lou wears a green collar. Their names are a reference to comedians Abbott and Costello. They are animated here with blood-red coats, a nod to Harley Quinn, instead of the tan ones from Batman: The Animated Series.
 Isis (voiced by Kathleen Barr) - A female cat who works with Catwoman. Isis, like her mistress, is seductive, and also a master thief. In Batman: The Animated Series she was a black or dark gray cat - possibly a Russian Blue; here, she is a Siamese.
 The Bad News Birds - Three trained birds who work with the Penguin and are usually up to some elaborate caper.
 Artie (voiced by Dale Wilson) - A puffin and leader of the Bad News Birds.
 Griff (voiced by Matt Hill) - A vulture and member of the Bad News Birds.
 Waddles (voiced by Terry Klassen) - A penguin and member of the Bad News Birds. In "When Penguins Fly", he temporarily gained the ability to fly by stealing it from Streaky.
 Dogwood (voiced by Louis Chirillo) - A half-dog, half-plant hybrid who can bring plants to life. Although his powers are reminiscent of Poison Ivy's, he does not seem to be associated with her, though he did fight Ace the Bat Hound as well. He bears a striking resemblance to another cartoon canine, Muttley.
 Mertin the Magnificent (voiced by Scott McNeil) - A magician's rabbit that carries around a magic wand that he stole from his master. Mertin is a master of magic himself. His only real intentions are stealing carrots, but he can hold his own against Krypto and Ace if confronted by them. His name is clearly a nod towards the famous wizard, Merlin.
 Superflea (voiced by Scott McNeil) - A Kryptonian flea who stowed away on Krypto's ship. Like all Kryptonian creatures, it gained a multitude of powers under Earth's yellow sun. It is invincible and gets stronger by feeding off dogs like Krypto.
 The Junkyard Dogs - A group of never-do-well strays led by Muttsy, a street-wise (but greedy) mutt. One member, Beazle, looks similar to Precious Pupp, but with a mangy butt. At best small-time hoods, they do periodically menace the heroes, and once took advantage of Krypto when he lost his memory due to red kryptonite exposure.
 Krypto's Tail (voiced by Samuel Vincent) - Once, when Krypto was exposed to Red Kryptonite, his tail became sentient, was separated from him and caused havoc.
 Bailey Whitney (voiced by Reece Thompson in Season 1 and Noel Callahan in Season 2) - Kevin and Melanie's bratty cousin, who bullies Kevin and Krypto. Bailey too discovered Krypto's secret and has unsuccessfully tried to reveal it.
 Blackbeak (voiced by Brian Drummond): A thorn on Stretch-O-Mutt's side. Blackbeak is a parrot who leads a pirate crew that steal cheese and crackers. He wears a Kryptonite necklace that makes Krypto and Streaky weak and hates cats.
 Pi-Rats - Blackbeak's pirate crew who are incredibly skilled in stealing cheese.
 Barrump Barrump (voiced by Phil Hayes) - A sinister space monkey who pulls pranks all around the galaxy. In his self-titled episode, he steals a device that freezes time so that he can pull pranks on everyone on Earth. Barrump Barrump is known as the "Primate Prankster" and is one of the galaxy's most dangerous criminals.

References

Krypto the Superdog
Krypto the Superdog
Lists of characters in Canadian television animation
Cartoon Network Studios characters